Global Social Policy is a triannual peer-reviewed academic journal that covers social policy, especially its transnational aspects. The editors-in-chief are Gerard Boychuk (Balsillie School of International Affairs), Rianne Mahon (Balsillie School of International Affairs), and Stephen McBride (McMaster University). It was established in 2001 with Bob Deacon (University of Sheffield) as its founding editor and is published by SAGE Publications.

Abstracting and indexing 
The journal is abstracted and indexed in the International Bibliography of the Social Sciences and Scopus.

External links 
 

SAGE Publishing academic journals
English-language journals
Sociology journals
Publications established in 2001
Triannual journals